The Dutch Eerste Divisie in the 1990–91 season was contested by 20 teams, one more than in the previous season. This was due to VC Vlissingen entering from the amateurs. De Graafschap won the championship.

New entrants
Entering from amateur football
 VC Vlissingen
Relegated from the 1989–90 Eredivisie
 BVV Den Bosch
 HFC Haarlem
DS '79 changed their name to Dordrecht '90 this season.

League standings

Promotion/relegation play-offs
The promotion/relegation play-offs consisted of three rounds. In the group round, four period winners (the best teams during each of the four quarters of the regular competition) and two (other) best placed teams in the league, played in two groups of three teams. The group winners would play in play-off 1. The winners of that play-off would be promoted to the Eredivisie, the loser had to take on the number 16 of the Eredivisie in play-off 2. These two teams played for the third and last position in the Eredivisie of next season.

Play-off 1

VVV-Venlo: promoted to Eredivisie 
NAC Breda: play-off 2

Play-off 2

SVV: remain in Eredivisie and merge with Dordrecht '90 
NAC Breda: remain in Eerste Divisie

See also
 1990–91 Eredivisie
 1990–91 KNVB Cup

References
Netherlands - List of final tables (RSSSF)

Eerste Divisie seasons
2
Neth